City of the Sun may refer to:
 City of the Sun is a Russian settlement inhabited by followers of the cultist Vissarion
 City of the Sun (band), an American acoustic post-rock trio from New York City
 City of the Sun (film), a 2017 documentary film, about Chiatura and Chiatura mine
 City of the Sun (Levien novel), a 2008 novel by David Levien
 City of the Sun (Maio novel), a 2014 novel by Juliana Maio
 City of the Sun, New Mexico, an intentional community in New Mexico 
 City of the Sun (TV series), a South Korean television drama series
 Stad van de Zon, housing project in the Netherlands
 The City of the Sun, the 1602 utopian work by Tommaso Campanella
 The City of the Sun is a nickname of Cagliari, the capital of the island of Sardinia
 The City of the Sun (film), 2005 comedy film co-produced by Slovakia and the Czech Republic

See also
 Sun City (disambiguation)
 Heliopolis (disambiguation) (Greek for "Sun City")